Jonathan Klick (born 1975) is an American economist who has written numerous works on empirical law and economics.  His scholarship addresses tort liability and moral hazard, criminal punishment, health regulation, and business regulation.  He is a Professor of Law at University of Pennsylvania Law School and previously served on the faculty at Florida State University College of Law. He is an editor-in-chief of the International Review of Law and Economics.

Professor Klick holds a J.D. and Ph.D. from George Mason University. Since 2007, he has been a senior economist at the RAND Corporation.

Notes and references

External links
 University of Pennsylvania Law School faculty profile
 Florida State University College of Law faculty profile
 

American legal scholars
21st-century American economists
George Mason University alumni
Florida State University faculty
University of Pennsylvania Law School faculty
Living people
1975 births
Scholars of tort law